The 2012–13 Kansas Jayhawks men's basketball team represented the University of Kansas in the 2012–13 NCAA Division I men's basketball season, which is the Jayhawks' 115th basketball season. The Jayhawks played their home games at Allen Fieldhouse.

Pre-season

Departures

Recruiting

|-
| colspan="7" style="padding-left:10px;" | Overall recruiting rankings:     Scout: 13     Rivals: 10       ESPN: 11 
|}

Coaching changes

Roster

Schedule

|-
!colspan=12 style="background:#00009C; color:#FFFFFF;"| European Exhibition Tour

|-
!colspan=12 style="background:#00009C; color:#FFFFFF;"| Exhibition

|-
!colspan=12 style="background:#00009C; color:#FFFFFF;"| Non-conference regular season

|-
!colspan=12 style="background:#00009C; color:#FFFFFF;"| Big 12 Conference Games

|-
!colspan=12 style="background:#00009C; color:#FFFFFF;"|Big 12 Tournament

|-
!colspan=12 style="background:#00009C; color:#FFFFFF;"|NCAA tournament

Rankings

*AP does not release post-tournament rankings

References

Kansas Jayhawks men's basketball seasons
Kansas
Kansas
Jay
Jay